Ernest G. Southey (January 23, 1874 - November 20, 1945) was an American architect from Bridgeport, Connecticut.

Having begun his practice by 1902, and continuing until his 1945 death, Ernest G. Southey had a career spanning almost the entire first half of the twentieth century.  During that period, he designed a number of major residences, commercial buildings, and the Bassick High School.  He was a member of the American Institute of Architects from 1916, and was cited for his architectural achievement during Bridgeport's centennial celebration in the 1930s.

Southey's son, David Ludgate Southey (1911-1974), was also an architect.

At least one of his designs has been placed on the National Register of Historic Places, and several others are contributing properties in historic districts.

Works
 William N. Beardsley House, 135 Park Ave., Bridgeport, Connecticut (1902)
 Danbury High School, 181 White St., Danbury, Connecticut (1902) - Demolished.
 Westport Town Hall (Old), 90 Post Rd. E., Westport, Connecticut (1908)
 Bijou Theatre, 275 Fairfield Ave., Bridgeport, Connecticut (1910)
 Lewis B. Curtis House, 250 Waldemere Ave., Bridgeport, Connecticut (1910) - Demolished 1962.
 William L. Taylor House, 10 Soundview Rd., Westport, Connecticut (1910)
 City Savings Bank Building, 948 Main St., Bridgeport, Connecticut (1912–14)
 William B. Leigh House, 409 Waldemere Ave., Bridgeport, Connecticut (1913)
 Dudley M. Morris House, 305 Linden Ave., Bridgeport, Connecticut (1915)
 Casino, Seaside Park, Bridgeport, Connecticut (1918)
 Harvey & Lewis Store, 1148 Main St., Bridgeport, Connecticut (1918)
 Bridgeport Gas Light Building, 815 Main St., Bridgeport, Connecticut (1924)
 Morris Plan Bank Building, 102 Bank St., Bridgeport, Connecticut (1924)
 Alexander L. DeLaney House, 64 Lyon Ter., Bridgeport, Connecticut (1925)
 Bassick High School, Fairfield Ave., Bridgeport, Connecticut (1928–29)
 Mechanics and Farmers Savings Bank Building, 930 Main St., Bridgeport, Connecticut (1930)
 Bridgeport Hydraulic Building, 835 Main St., Bridgeport, Connecticut (1931)
 St. Vincent's Hospital (Completion), 2800 Main St., Bridgeport, Connecticut (1932) - Demolished.

References

1874 births
1945 deaths
Architects from Bridgeport, Connecticut
20th-century American architects